Masat (“مصاد” (Maṣād), Masad: 1928; Masat, 1933; Yıldırım, 1968; Masat, 1990s) is a village in the Bayburt District, Bayburt Province, Turkey. Its population is 550 (2021).

Name 
Name of the village was Masad in Ottoman Era and the spelling was various. “مصاد” (Maṣād), “ماساد” (Māsād), “مساد” (Masād),  “مصعاد” (Maṣˁād) and “ماساط” (Māsāṭ) were some spellings to indicate the village on maps.

History 
After 1959, village name become Yıldırım but it did not last so much. The former name (Masat) has replaced Yıldırım in 1990s. According to the population census held in 1835, the village was hosting 15 young people, 12 children, and 20 elder Muslim living in 20 houses in total.

Geography 
The village is 32 kilometers from the province center. Masat village has two major settlements i.e. Upper Masat and Lower Masat although they have not different official statuses. The village center is based in Lower Masat with 18 Numbered Family Health Center, Dede Korkut Primary School, Dede Korkut Imam Hatip Middle School, and Masat Village Mosque. The other mosque of the village is based in Upper Masat in addition to being 3 kilometers away from Lower Masat. Masat/Yıldırım Stream and Çoruh River flow through this village.

Tourism 
The Dome of Dede Korkut is two kilometers away from the village center. The dome was renovated in 1994 and opened in a different view.

References

Villages in Bayburt District